Acanthocephalus echigoensis is a species of parasitic worm in the phylum Acanthocephala. Found both in California and in Thailand, it has been known to parasitize the sockeye salmon, chum salmon, rainbow trout, and barramundi.

References

Echinorhynchidae
Animals described in 1920
Fauna of California
Invertebrates of Thailand